Mud River may refer to:

Mud River in Connecticut
Mud River (Georgia)
Mud River (Kentucky)
Mud River (Red Lake) in Minnesota
Mud River (Thief River tributary) in Minnesota
Mud River (West Virginia)
Mud River in Oregon

See also 
 Mud (disambiguation)
 Muddy River (disambiguation)